Thermae may refer to:

Thermae, the building that housed ancient Roman public baths
Thermae (Icaria), a town of ancient Icaria, Greece
Termini Imerese, Thermae Himerenses or Thermae Himeraeae, in ancient Sicily
Thermae Bath Spa, a modern spa built next to the Roman Baths in Bath, England
Thermae Selinuntiae or Thermae Selinuntinae, was the classical name of Sciacca in ancient Sicily
Thermae Romae, a Japanese manga and feature film